McLendon is a surname. Notable people with the surname include:

George McLendon (born 1952), American chemist
Gordon McLendon (1921–1986), American radio pioneer
John McLendon (1915–1999), American basketball coach
Mac McLendon (born 1945), American golfer
Robert L. McLendon, Jr., American academic
Steve McLendon (born 1986), American football player
T. A. McLendon (born 1984), American football player
Wendi McLendon-Covey (born 1969), American actor, writer and comedian

See also
McLendon-Chisholm, Texas, city in the United States
McLendon–McDougald Gymnasium, sports venue in North Carolina, United States

Anglicised Scottish Gaelic-language surnames
Patronymic surnames